The Greatest Wedding on Earth (aka Nan bei yi jia qin) is a 1962 Hong Kong comedy film directed by Tian-Lin Wang, and written by Eileen Chang and Yuen Chor.

Plot 
A rivalry between two local restaurateurs (one serving Cantonese food and one serving northern cuisine) heats up when their children decide to get married.

Cast 

 Louming Bai as Shen Peiming
 Kelly Lai Chen as Li Huanxiang
 Ching Cheung as Shen Qingwen
Leung Sing-po as Shen Jianbing

References 

Hong Kong comedy films
1962 films
Films directed by Wong Tin-lam
Films with screenplays by Eileen Chang